Os Belenenses Basquetebol  is the professional basketball team of Clube de Futebol Os Belenenses, based in Lisbon, Portugal. The team plays in the Proliga.
Established in 1919, at the same time as the Belenenses football team, its greatest achievements occurred between the late 1930s and 1950s, where it won two league championships and two cup competitions, among several other competitions. It was the first Portugueses Women´s League champion in 1954.

In 2004 the team played in FIBA CUP making the European competitions debut, playing the FIBA EuroCup Challenge, ending the participation with 2 wins and 4 losses, in a group with Alba Fehérvár, BC Boncourt and also BC Brno, which was actually the opponent in the first european match. In 2007, the team reached the Portuguese Cup Final against FC Porto, losing by 86-77. In the 2008–09 season, Belenenses suspended the Basketball team due to financial problems. 
The club was reinstated a season later in the lower divisions, making its way back to the professional league. Playing in the Proliga for the fifth consecutive season, the team is coached by the well-known Portuguese ex-player Sérgio Ramos.

Curiosity
In 2008, the Belenenses basketball player Paulo Simão ended his international career, being at that moment, the Portuguese player with the most caps ever (113).

Main Honours

Domestic competitions
 Liga Portuguesa de Basquetebol: 2
 1938–39, 1944–45
 Taça de Portugal: 2
 1944–45, 1958–59

Current roster
Source:

References

External links
 Official website (Portuguese)

C.F. Os Belenenses
Basketball teams in Portugal